Amirabad-e Ali Nur (also Romanized as Amīrābād-e ʿAlī Nūr; also known as Amīrābād) is a village in Khorram Dasht Rural District, in the Central District of Famenin County, Hamadan Province, Iran. At the 2006 census, its population was 968, in 230 families.

References 

Populated places in Famenin County